Monte delle Rose is a mountain in the Monti Sicani, in Sicily, southern Italy.

Description

The Monte delle Rose is located at the boundary with Sosio Valley Natural Reserve. Historically, it was mentioned by Aristotle and Pliny the Elder and was famous for its herbs, studied by numerous botanists.

References

Mountains of Sicily